The Niagara Falls City School District is a public school district containing 11 schools in Niagara Falls, New York.  The Superintendent of Schools is Mark Laurrie.

History 
The district was founded in the early 1900s.

In 1953 the district purchased land in Love Canal from Hooker Chemical Company, fully aware that the land had been used as a toxic waste disposal site. This would eventually lead to the Love Canal disaster.

Board of education
The Board of education is made up of nine members. The current board members are:
James Cancemi, President
Robert M. Restaino
Ron Barstys
Earl F. Bass
Rev. Kevin Dobbs
Arthur "Art" Jocoy Jr.
Anthony Paretto
Russel Petrozzi
Nicholas Vilardo

Schools

Secondary schools

High schools 
Niagara Falls High School - The current Niagara Falls High School opened on September 6, 2000, retiring two aging high schools. Chief Educational Administrator - Cheryl Vilardo

Middle schools 
Gaskill Preparatory School- Opened in September 1931. Dedicated in March 1932. Principal - Derek Zimmerman 
LaSalle Preparatory School- Opened on September 1, 1931. Dedicated on February 5, 1932. Principal - Kathy Urban

Primary schools 
Cataract Elementary School- Opened on September 6, 2007, in former place of Niagara Middle School. Principal - Stan Wojton
79th Street Elementary School- Built and opened in 1950. Principal - Diane Coty
Harry F. Abate Elementary School- Built and opened on September 6, 1972. Dedicated on February 18, 1973. Principal - Lynne Tompkins 
Geraldine J. Mann Elementary School (formerly 95th Street Elementary School) - Built and opened in 1958. Renamed and rededicated as Geraldine J. Mann Elementary School on May 29, 1981. Principal - Italo J. Baldassarre
Henry J. Kalfas Magnet School (formerly Beech Avenue School)- Built and dedicated in 1957 and opened in 1958. Renamed and rededicated in 1978 as Henry J. Kalfas School and in June 1990 as Henry J. Kalfas Early Childhood Magnet School. Principal - Carrie Buchman
Maple Avenue Elementary School- Built and opened in the fall of 1922. Principal - Jeff Showers
Hyde Park Elementary School- Built and opened in September 1929. Principal - Gerald Orfano
Bloneva Bond Primary School (formerly Niagara Street Elementary School) - Built and opened in 1919. The original Niagara Street Elementary School closed on June 17, 2005 and was demolished in December 2005. The new building was completed on August 1, 2007, had a grand opening on August 29, and opened for the school year on September 6. Dedicated in September 2007 and renamed and rededicated as Bloneva Bond Primary School on August 30, 2022. Principal - Rocco Merino

Other
Niagara Falls Community Education Center, Coordinator - Andrew Touma

Former schools

Former secondary schools

Former high schools
LaSalle Senior High School March 25, 1957 - June 14, 2000
The Trott Vocational School 1928 - June 1988
”Old” Niagara Falls High School September 1903 - June 14, 2000

Former middle schools
 Niagara Middle School September 1995 - June 12, 2007
Niagara Middle School (NMS) becomes Cataract Elementary School on September 6, 2007.
North Junior Middle School  1923-1982
South Junior Middle School  1923-1985

Former primary schools 
 99th Street School (knowingly built atop of the Love Canal toxic waste dump) - February 14, 1955 - August 2, 1978
 60th Street Elementary School (Now community education center) Fall 1962 - June 12, 2007
 66th Street School (Now district administration building) February 14, 1955 - June 12, 2007 
 Cayuga Drive School 1909-1976
 Ferry Avenue School 1902-1980
 Whitney Avenue School 1897-1938
 Ashland Avenue School 1903-July 1, 1972
 Cleveland Avenue School 1872-1976
 Center Avenue School 1898-1968
 Sugar Street School 1895-1959
 3rd Street School 1852 - February 1, 1962
 5th Street School 1855-1972
 10th Street School September 1914 – 1972
 13th Street School 1907-1968
 17th Street School 1926-1973
 22nd Street School 1907-1972
 24th Street School 1918-1976
 39th Street School February 14, 1955 – 1980
 93rd Street School 1950-1980 (closed due to concerns about toxic waste from the nearby Love Canal)
 Pacific Avenue School 1909-1973. Pacific Avenue School was located at 7116 Buffalo Avenue.

References

External links

Education in Niagara Falls, New York
School districts in New York (state)
Love Canal